Am I Beautiful? is a 1998 German comedy film directed by Doris Dörrie.

Cast 

 Marie Zielcke as Angelina
 Carla Weindler as Carla
 Julian Messner as Philip
 Suzanne von Borsody as Lucy
 Franka Potente as Linda
  as Werner
 Steffen Wink as Klaus
 Anica Dobra as Franziska
 Iris Berben as Rita
  as Fred
 Maria Schrader as Elke
 Dietmar Schönherr as Juan
 Beatriz Castillón Mateo as Marie (young)
 Uwe Ochsenknecht as Bodo
 Lorenza Sophia Zorer as Engel
 Heike Makatsch as Vera
 Juan Diego Botto as Felipe
  as Tamara
 Nina Petri as Charlotte
 Joachim Król as Robert
 Lina Lambsdorff as Lili
 Gottfried John as Herbert
  as Jessica
 Senta Berger as Unna
  as Spanish boy
 Michael Klemm as Holger
 Enrico Boetcher as Man at airport
 Christine Osterlein as Old lady
 Ludwig Haller as Man with sunglasses
 Otto Sander as David
 Pierre Sanoussi-Bliss as Paco
 Maria Piniella as Pinkola
  as Singer
Sound track composed by Roman Bunka.

References

External links 

1998 films
1998 comedy films
German comedy films
1990s German-language films
1990s German films